Philip Highway is a road in the southern part of the Elizabeth area through the suburbs of Elizabeth and Elizabeth South. It connects from Main North Road adjacent to the Elizabeth City Centre to route A13 John Rice Avenue and  Salisbury Highway. It continues past this large roundabout into Elizabeth Vale as a minor road which ends at the Little Para River linear park.

Route description
Philip Highway starts at Main North Road opposite Yorketown Road which winds up the face of the Adelaide Hills towards One Tree Hill. Philip Highway passes through the commercial centre of Elizabeth, with the main Elizabeth Shopping Centre on one side and other shops and businesses opposite. Playford International College and Kaurna Plains School follow on one side, with playing fields on the other side.

Philip Highway then passes through the residential part of Elizabeth South, past Elizabeth South Primary School and the Elizabeth South local shops and hotel. Once it crosses Hogarth Road, it enters the industrial part of Elizabeth South passing a number of factories, the largest of which is the Holden factory. Philip Highway ends as an arterial road immediate after Holden at the roundabout with John Rice Avenue (which continues as Salisbury Highway from the next intersection). It continues as a minor road for another  through residential Elizabeth Grove to the South Para River reserve, but does not provide a bridge over the river.

References

Roads in Adelaide
Freeways and highways in Adelaide